Cirripectes obscurus, the gargantuan blenny, is a species of combtooth blenny considered endemic to coral reefs in the Hawaiian island chain, although one putative specimen has been collected in the Austral Islands, indicating a possible antitropical distribution. This species reaches a length of  TL.

References

obscurus
Endemic fauna of Hawaii
Fish of Hawaii
Fish described in 1927